Erzincan earthquake may refer to:

 1939 Erzincan earthquake
 1992 Erzincan earthquake

See also 

 List of earthquakes in Turkey